Pitcairnia dolichopetala is a plant species in the genus Pitcairnia. This species is native to Ecuador.

References

dolichopetala
Flora of Ecuador